Ayock Louis Berty (born November 21, 1981 in Yaoundé, Cameroon) is a Cameroonian former professional footballer.

He played for Rangers in the Hong Kong First Division League in 2006–07, for Kitchee in 2007–08, and for Pegasus in 2008–09.

References 

1981 births
Living people
Cameroonian footballers
Hong Kong Rangers FC players
Kitchee SC players
TSW Pegasus FC players
Hong Kong First Division League players
Persijatim players
Persija Jakarta players
Persijap Jepara players
Indonesian Premier Division players
Cameroonian expatriate sportspeople in Hong Kong
Cameroonian expatriate sportspeople in Indonesia
Expatriate footballers in Indonesia
Expatriate footballers in Hong Kong
Association football midfielders